Snow Hill was a community, now extinct, in Harrison Township, Miami County, in the U.S. state of Indiana.

History
Snow Hill was laid out in 1853 by Jacob Miller and Elijah Lieurance. In its heyday, the town had a saw mill, a blacksmith shop, a cabinet shop, and a general store. When the Pan Handle Railroad was built in Miami County, it was not extended to Snow Hill, and the community became a ghost town.

References

Geography of Miami County, Indiana
Ghost towns in Indiana